Coalition for the Homeless is a not-for-profit advocacy group focused on homelessness in the United States. The coalition has engaged in landmark litigation to protect the rights of homeless people, including the right to shelter and the right to vote, and also advocates for long-term solutions to the problem of homelessness.  Formed in 1981, the Coalition has offices in New York City and Albany, New York.

The Coalition provides food, clothing, eviction prevention, crisis services, permanent housing, job training and special programs for youth to more than 3,500 homeless men, women, and children daily in New York.

Litigation
In 1979, in the case Callahan v. Carey, attorney and founder of the Coalition, achieved a landmark precedent in New York City, establishing that all homeless individuals have the right to emergency shelter.

In Pitts v. Black, a 1984 lawsuit, the Coalition successfully argued that homeless people in New York should be permitted to register to vote even if they reside in shelters or on the streets.

Other services and programs
The Coalition for the Homeless has a number of programs that assist more than 3,500 homeless and at-risk New Yorkers each day. These programs include:  permanent housing for families, individuals, and people with AIDS; a mobile soup kitchen serving 1,000 hot nutritious meals in 35 sites every night; job training and placement; a summer camp for homeless children; crisis intervention services that help people keep their housing and get food, clothing, and shelter; rental assistance with counseling.

See also

Homelessness
Homelessness in the United States
Poverty in the United States

References

External links
 

Homelessness charities
Political advocacy groups in the United States
Organizations established in 1981
Charities based in New York (state)